"Talkin' to the Wall" is a single originally recorded by country singer Warner MacPherson (better known by his stage name Warner Mack). He co-wrote it with Bill Montague. It became a top ten hit for him when the song peaked at No. 3 in the Country Singles chart in 1966.

The song was covered by American country music artist Lynn Anderson. Released in June 1974, it was the second single from her album Smile for Me. The song peaked at number 7 on the Billboard Hot Country Singles chart. It also reached number 1 on the RPM Country Tracks chart in Canada.

Chart performance

Warner Mack

Lynn Anderson

References

1966 singles
1974 singles
Warner Mack songs
Lynn Anderson songs
Songs written by Warner Mack
Columbia Records singles
1966 songs